Indonesia and Ukraine established diplomatic relations in 1992. Indonesia has an embassy in Kyiv that also accredited for Georgia and Armenia, while Ukraine has an embassy in Jakarta. Both nations has agreed to expand cooperations in heavy industries, military, space technology and exploration, tourism, sports, economy and trade sectors, as well as cooperations within international organizations.

History
After the dissolution of the Soviet Union, Indonesia promptly recognized Ukraine on 28 December 1991. On 6 June 1992 in Moscow, Indonesia and Ukraine signed the joint communique on establishment of diplomatic relations. Indonesia established its embassy in Kyiv in 1994, while Ukraine opened its embassy in Jakarta in 1996.

During the 2022 Russian invasion of Ukraine, President of Indonesia Joko Widodo visited Kyiv to deliver humanitarian aid and push Volodymyr Zelenskyy to open dialogue with Russian President Vladimir Putin.

Economy and trade
In 2011, the total trade volume between two nations has reached US$1.27 billion, and increased to US$1.32 billion in 2012. The trade balances between two nations is in favour to Ukraine; the Indonesian export value to Ukraine in 2012 was US$548.9 million, while Indonesia's import value from Ukraine for the same year was US$774.1 million.

Indonesian export commodities to Ukraine includes palm oil, nickel, natural rubber, paper, animal fats, coffee, tea, plastic, cocoa, spices, electrical equipment, textiles and furniture, while importing fertilizers, milk, sugar, wheat, iron and steel products, arms and weaponry and also gun powder from Ukraine. Among ASEAN exporters to Ukraine, Indonesia is ranked as the highest. Ukraine regards Indonesia as an important arms market.

See also
 Foreign relations of Indonesia 
 Foreign relations of Ukraine

Notes

External links
Embassy of the Republic of Indonesia in Kyiv, Ukraine
Embassy of Ukraine in Jakarta, Indonesia 

 
Ukraine
Bilateral relations of Ukraine